Veronika Heine, born 8 September 1986 in Vienna, is an Austrian table tennis player.

She competed at the 2008 Summer Olympics, reaching the bronze medal playoff of the team competition.

References
2008 Olympic profile

1986 births
Living people
Austrian female table tennis players
Table tennis players at the 2008 Summer Olympics
Olympic table tennis players of Austria
Sportspeople from Vienna
21st-century Austrian women